Atanas Atanasov - Orela (Bulgarian: Атанас Атанасов - Орела; born 16 March 1969) is a former Bulgarian footballer and currently manager of Dobrudzha.

In 2015, he and other Spartak Varna legends founded FC Spartak Varna.

On 20 April 2017 he was announced as manager of Montana. He couldn't save the team from relegation as Montana was eliminated in the final relegation play-off by Septemvri Sofia. He left the club in June 2017, after his contract expired.

Managerial statistics

References 

1969 births
Living people
Bulgarian footballers
PFC Spartak Varna players
FC Montana players
First Professional Football League (Bulgaria) players
Association football defenders
Bulgarian football managers
PFC Spartak Varna managers
FC Montana managers
Sportspeople from Varna, Bulgaria